is a Japanese new-age musical group, founded in 1980 by composer Yoshiaki Hoshi as , changing its name to Himekami in 1984.

The band's name is derived from Mount Himekami in Morioka, Iwate Prefecture.

The group's current line-up consists of synthesizer player  and vocalists Wakako Nakajima, Tomoko Fujii, Junko Shiwa, and Yoriko Sano.

The album Ama Takami no Kuni was the first released by the group following founder Hoshi's death in October 2004. Higher Octave Music has released a number of their albums in North America.

Albums

As Himekami Sensation
 (1981, based on the work by Matsuo Bashō)
 (1982)
  (1982, main theme for the Tetsutarō Murano film Shiroikawa)
  (1983)

Sources:

As Himekami
 (1984, collaboration with YAS-KAZ)
 (1985, collaboration with YAS-KAZ, theme of NHK Gurutto Kaidō 3000km)
 (1986)
 (1987)
 (1988, soundtrack for the 32nd Yukunen Kurunen celebration)
 (1989)
 (1990)
 (1992)
 (1993, the song "Kaze no Inori" on this album is used as the theme song for the "Homura Kikō" segment of the NHK Taiga Drama Homura Tatsu)
 (1994)
 (1995)
 (1995)
 (1996)
 (1997)
 (1998, winner of the 40th Japan Record Project Award)
 (1999)
 (2000)
 (2002, opening theme for the original soundtrack)
 (2003)
 (2004)
 (2008-02-04 (released via the web), 2008-04-02 (released in stores))

Sources:

Singles
 (1981)
 (1985, collaboration with YAS-KAZ, theme of NHK Gurutto Kaidō 3000km)
 (1994, collaboration with Oyunna)
 (1996)
 (1998, theme song from the TBS series by the same title)
 (2000, theme song from the TBS series by the same title)

Sources:

References

External links
 Official site
 Official Toshiba EMI site

Japanese electronic music groups
Musical groups established in 1980
New-age music groups
Musical groups from Miyagi Prefecture